The National Wrestling Alliance (NWA) is an American professional wrestling promotion and former professional wrestling governing body operated by its parent company Lightning One, Inc.

Founded in 1948, the NWA began as a governing body for a group of regional professional wrestling promotions, the heads of which made up the board of directors. The group operated a territory system which sanctioned their own company championships while recognizing a singular world champion who defended his title across all the territories, participated in talent exchanges, and collectively protected the territorial integrity of member promotions. Prior to the 1960s it acted as the sole governing body for most of professional wrestling. It remained the largest and most influential body in wrestling until the mid-1980s by which time most of the original member promotions went out of business as a result of the World Wrestling Federation's (WWF, now WWE) national expansion.

In September 1993, the largest remaining member promotion, World Championship Wrestling (WCW), left the NWA for the second and final time. The NWA would continue as a loose coalition of independent promotions, with NWA: Total Nonstop Action (NWA:TNA) given exclusivity over its World Heavyweight and Tag Team championships from June 2002 to May 2007.

In August 2012, the NWA discontinued its memberships and started licensing its brand to wrestling promotions. In 2017, it was purchased by Billy Corgan through his Lightning One, Inc. company. By 2019, the NWA would transition to a stand-alone promotion.

History

Formation

In 1948, Paul "Pinkie" George, a promoter from the Midwest, founded the National Wrestling Alliance with the backing of five other promoters: Al Haft, Tony Stecher, Harry Light, Orville Brown, and Sam Muchnick. The concept of the NWA was to consolidate the championships of these regional companies into one true world championship of professional wrestling, whose holder would be recognized worldwide. This newly formed NWA Board of Directors decided on Brown to be the first-ever NWA World Heavyweight Champion.

Governing body

1950s–1970s
In 1950, Sam Muchnick, one of the original promoters of the NWA and Lou Thesz's booker, was named the new NWA President, a position to which he was unanimously re-elected and held until 1960, making him one of the longest-tenured presidents in the organization's history. Following the advent of television, professional wrestling matches began to be aired nationally during this time, reaching a larger audience than ever before. Rising demand and national expansion made wrestling a much more and lucrative form of entertainment than in decades previous. This would be known as the "Golden Age" for the wrestling industry. From 1948 to 1955, each of the three major television networks broadcast wrestling shows; the largest supporter being the DuMont Television Network.

In 1956, allegations were made that the NWA was an illegal monopoly blocking competition. An investigation led by the US Department of Justice resulted in the "NWA Consent Decree of 1956" (The U.S. v. National Wrestling Alliance). Several promoters would leave the organization during this time, with some managing to find niches in the United States. In 1957, Montreal promoter Eddie Quinn walked out of the August NWA meeting in St. Louis, having fallen out with Muchnick over a number of issues. At the time Quinn walked out, a wrestler of his named Édouard Carpentier was involved in an angle where he and Lou Thesz were both being presented around the NWA as world champion after Carpentier had a disputed win over Thesz on June 14, 1957.

As the 1950s came to an close, professional wrestling was losing television ratings, and soon TV stations dropped most wrestling shows from their lineups. The remaining televised wrestling promoters had small, local syndicated shows, which aired as late-night filler programming. Promoters started using localized television by purchasing airtime from rival territories, at the consequence of putting some of them out of business.

On January 24, 1963, at Maple Leaf Gardens in Toronto, Lou Thesz defeated Buddy Rogers in a one-fall match and was declared NWA World Heavyweight Champion for the third and final time (official). However, after the event, Vincent J. McMahon and Toots Mondt from the Capital Wrestling Corporation promotion in the Northeast territory refused to recognize the title change since Thesz as the NWA World Heavyweight Champion was not a strong draw in their territory. They then withdrew CWC from the NWA. As a result, McMahon and Mondt formed the World Wide Wrestling Federation (later to be known as WWE) with Rogers as its first world champion in April 1963. Although both Gagne and McMahon promoted their own world champions, their promotions continued to have representatives on the NWA Board of Directors and regularly exchanged talent with NWA promotions during this time.

Wrestling's popularity continued to decline in the 1970s. The WWWF quietly rejoined the NWA in 1971 after their biggest draw, Bruno Sammartino, left the promotion. While still an NWA member in 1979, they changed their name from World Wide Wrestling Federation (WWWF) to World Wrestling Federation (WWF). At some point during the decade, Muchnick reportedly declared Atlanta, Georgia as the "leading wrestling city" for its "drawing capacity and near-capacity crowds at the City Auditorium or the Omni every Friday." While the American Wrestling Association (AWA) and World Wide Wrestling Federation/World Wrestling Federation (WWWF/WWF) both faltered during the 1970s, the NWA once again took over as the top promotion and gained huge dominance with their program, Georgia Championship Wrestling, which would become the first nationally broadcast wrestling program on cable television through then-superstation TBS in 1979. They brought in Gordon Solie, dubbed "The Walter Cronkite of Professional Wrestling," from former NWA President Eddie Graham's Championship Wrestling from Florida territory to be lead commentator and host.

1980s–1993

Videotape trading and cable television paved the way for the decline of the NWA's inter-regional business model, as viewers could now see plot holes and inconsistencies between each territories' storylines. The presence of stars like Ric Flair on TV every week made their special appearances in each region less of a draw.

The WWF left the NWA for good in 1983, as Vincent K. McMahon, who bought the WWF from his father in 1982, worked to get WWF programming on syndicated television all across the United States. That same year, Jim Crockett Promotions and the NWA created its primary supercard, Starrcade, the first to be broadcast via closed-circuit networks and was regarded as their flagship event.

On Saturday, July 14, 1984, in what would become known as Black Saturday, McMahon bought NWA member Georgia Championship Wrestling (GCW) and merged it into the WWF. The WWF would take over GCW's TV slot on TBS, which had been home to GCW's World Championship Wrestling program for 12 years. This move proved disastrous as ratings would plummet, and the WWF would end up losing money on the deal. Then-NWA President Jim Crockett, Jr., the owner of Jim Crockett Promotions (JCP), would buy the World Championship Wrestling program from McMahon for $1 million (US) and returned NWA programming to TBS. By 1985, Jim Crockett Promotions (JCP) would become the flagship of the NWA by acquiring more time slots on TBS and merging with other NWA territories in attempt to compete with the WWF.

With the success of WrestleMania III in 1987, the WWF would schedule another pay-per-view, Survivor Series, on Thanksgiving night to compete directly with NWA's Starrcade event, and demanded exclusivity from cable providers on carriage of the event. As a result, Starrcade was moved to December the following year, with the show now held around Christmas Day beginning in 1988. The WWF then scheduled their first Royal Rumble event in January 1988 to counterprogram against the NWA's Bunkhouse Stampede. The NWA responded by creating Clash of the Champions on TBS to counterprogram WrestleMania IV.

By 1988, Jim Crockett Promotions was facing bankruptcy. On October 11, under the direction of owner Ted Turner, TBS bought the assets of JCP and renamed it World Championship Wrestling (WCW) after the TV show of the same name. Originally incorporated by TBS as the Universal Wrestling Corporation, Turner promised fans that WCW would retain the athlete-oriented style of the NWA. The sale was completed on November 2, 1988, with a television taping of NWA World Championship Wrestling that very same date in WCW's hometown of Atlanta. By September 1993, WCW would withdraw completely from the NWA.

1993–2012
On August 27, 1994, NWA: Eastern Championship Wrestling (ECW) held a World Title tournament for the vacant NWA World Heavyweight Championship. Unbeknownst to any one, the event was staged for ECW's public withdrawal from the NWA, with tournament winner Shane Douglas throwing down the NWA title belt and instead picking up the ECW Heavyweight Championship belt, proclaiming himself to be the ECW World Heavyweight Champion. ECW founder Tod Gordon would subsequently announce ECW's secession from the NWA, rechristening the promotion as Extreme Championship Wrestling.

In 1998, the World Wrestling Federation reached an agreement to use the likeness of the NWA titles, branding, and its history, to create a storyline. It would be later claimed that WWE still owned the rights. Despite the NWA receiving international television publicity during the angle, it was considered a failure due to low viewer interests.

In June 2002, Jeff and Jerry Jarrett launched a new promotion called NWA: Total Nonstop Action (NWA:TNA; now known as Impact Wrestling). NWA:TNA was given creative control over the NWA World Heavyweight and World Tag Team championships through an agreement with the NWA. This would last until March 2007, when the NWA terminated its agreement with TNA. TNA would lose control over the NWA World Heavyweight and World Tag Team championships by the morning of the 2007 Sacrifice pay-per-view event on May 13.

On September 17, 2010, KDOC-TV Los Angeles premiered NWA: Championship Wrestling from Hollywood.

R. Bruce Tharpe and International Wrestling Corp. (2012–2017) 
In August 2012, International Wrestling Corp, LLC, a holding company run by Houston-based attorney and wrestling promoter R. Bruce Tharpe, sued Trobich, Baucom, the NWA, and its then-parent company, Trobich's Pro Wrestling Organization LLC, claiming insurance fraud regarding the NWA's liability insurance policy. A settlement was negotiated that transferred the rights to the NWA name and trademarks from Trobich's company to Tharpe's. The new organization moved from a membership model to a licensing model, which caused many promotions to immediately cut ties with the NWA. On September 9, 2012, Championship Wrestling from Hollywood (CWFH) announced it had left the NWA. CWFH was the unofficial home promotion of both the then-current NWA champion (Adam Pearce) and the most recent previous champion (Colt Cabana), both of whom publicly left the NWA, with Pearce vacating the NWA World Title while exiting. Other major NWA territories like NWA Pro/NWA Pro West, NWA Georgia, NWA Pro East, NWA Southwest and NWA Midwest folded.

In 2013, the NWA re-established a relationship with New Japan Pro-Wrestling, where Bruce Tharpe became an on-screen character, portraying a villainous manager of wrestlers representing the NWA. Over the next two years, the NWA World Heavyweight, World Tag Team and World Junior Heavyweight Championships all changed hands at NJPW events.

In September 2016, NWA signed a deal with the new Japanese Diamond Stars Wrestling (DSW) promotion to promote shows in not only Japan, but also other parts of Asia. As part of the deal, DSW chairman Hideo Shimada was appointed the NWA Vice President of the Asian Pacific region while Jimmy Suzuki was appointed senior NWA consultant.

Billy Corgan and Lightning One Inc. (2017–present)

2017–2019: Acquisition and relaunch
On May 1, 2017, it was reported that Billy Corgan, lead singer of the Smashing Pumpkins, had agreed to purchase the NWA, including its name, rights, trademarks and championship belts. The report was confirmed by Tharpe that same day. Over the following weeks, the NWA trademarks were moved from Tharpe's International Wrestling Corp. over to Corgan's Lightning One, Inc. production company. According to multiple sources, as part of his acquisition of the NWA, Corgan would also purchase Tharpe's stake in the NWA's "On Demand" VOD service and licensing of the Paul Boesch wrestling library. Corgan's ownership of the NWA took effect on October 1, 2017. All licenses granted by Tharpe to use the NWA branding expired the previous day, putting Corgan in complete control of both the brand and its championships.

On September 23, 2017, Nick Aldis made his debut for Championship Wrestling from Hollywood and challenged Tim Storm for the NWA World Heavyweight Championship. The match took place on November 12 and saw Storm retain the title. This was the first title match under the new NWA regime headed by Billy Corgan. On December 9, Aldis defeated Storm in a rematch at Cage of Death 19 to become the new NWA World Heavyweight Champion, making him the second British-born champion after Gary Steele.

In 2018, the NWA briefly allied with Impact Wrestling (the former NWA: Total Nonstop Action) to hold an Empty Arena match at the Impact Zone at Universal Orlando in Orlando, Florida. It was contested by Tim Storm and Jocephus and served as a qualifier to challenge then-NWA World Heavyweight Champion Nick Aldis. The match was recorded on January 14, 2018 and uploaded to YouTube the next day.

Starting in 2018, NWA allied with Ring of Honor (ROH). NWA wrestlers such as Aldis, James Storm, and Eli Drake appeared at several ROH events, with ROH-contracted talent even winning NWA titles. On September 1, 2018, the NWA World Heavyweight Championship was featured at All In, with Cody defeating Aldis for the title. After All In, the NWA would return to hosting its own events. The NWA 70th Anniversary Show, which took place on October 21, 2018, was the first to be produced directly under Lightning One, and was co-produced with Global Force Entertainment; the event was streamed live on FITE TV. The main event saw Aldis defeat Cody to recapture the NWA World Heavyweight Championship and Willie Mack winning a tournament for the vacant NWA National Championship.

The Fourth Crockett Cup, an eight-team, single-elimination tournament that was revived to crown new NWA World Tag Team Champions, took place on April 27, 2019, as another collaboration between the NWA and ROH. This would be the last event to be co-promoted with ROH; on July 24, 2019, the NWA announced that had ended their partnership. Subsequentially, it was announced the following month that the NWA would host tapings in Atlanta on September 30 and October 1 for a new television series, later revealed to be titled NWA Power.

2020–present: COVID-19, restructuring and departures
In January 2020, Marty Scurll, and other Ring of Honor talent, began to appear at NWA events once again as part of an inter-promotional angle. In addition to re-signing with ROH, Scurll would join the company's booking team, enabling him to appear for both the NWA and ROH. However, in the fallout of the Speaking Out Movement, Scurll was accused of taking advantage of a 16-year-old girl who was inebriated. After an investigation, Scurll would be removed from his position as booker, and by the following January in 2021, would be no longer under contract.

Nick Aldis was scheduled to face PCO at Supercard of Honor XIV on April 4, 2020, before the event was cancelled due to the COVID-19 pandemic. On June 18, 2020, Dave Lagana resigned as Vice President of the NWA after allegations of sexual assault were made public. The promotion would go into hiatus as a result of this and the pandemic. During this time, several wrestlers would also leave the NWA, including former Tag team Champions James Storm and Eli Drake, Marti Belle, former women's champion Allysin Kay, former Tag Team Champion Royce Isaacs, and former Television Champion Zicky Dice.

NWA World Women's Champion Thunder Rosa would make appearances for All Elite Wrestling (AEW) while under contract with the NWA. On September 5, 2020, Rosa unsuccessfully challenged AEW Women's World Championship Hikaru Shida at All Out. On October 27, 2020, Serena Deeb defeated Rosa during the United Wrestling Network's Primetime Live event to become the new NWA World Women's Champion.

On March 2, 2021, the NWA announced their return to promoting events, with the NWA Back For The Attack pay-per-view and new Power episodes as part of a new distribution agreement with FITE TV. As part of this agreement, the NWA would remove content from their YouTube channel.

On January 5, 2022, the NWA announced the launch of the NWA All Access subscription package on FITE TV, including past and upcoming pay-per-view events, new episodes of Power on Tuesdays, and the newly announced NWA USA weekly series. In addition, it was announced that Power would return to YouTube, airing on Fridays after the FITE premiere, and that NWA USA would air on Saturdays on the platform before moving to Sundays on FITE. Finally, it was announced that the NWA would expand their PPV schedule to six events per year, as part of a new deal with FITE TV.

Personnel

Leadership
All held the title of President except where footnoted.

Programming and events

Current

Ten Pounds of Gold
Ten Pounds of Gold is a documentary series chronicling the journey and career of the current NWA Worlds Heavyweight Champion as well as others in the division. Debuting on October 20, 2017, on the NWA's YouTube channel, it was the first series to be produced after the organization's acquisition.

NWA Powerrr
Powerrr is the flagship program of the NWA that currently airs Tuesdays at 6:05 pm ET on the NWA's YouTube channel. The series debuted on October 8, 2019, originally airing on the NWA's YouTube channel. From 2021 to the end of 2022 the show had a first airing on Tuesday at 6:05 pm ET exclusively on FITE TV with the episode debuting on the NWA's YouTube channel later in the same week in Friday at 6:05 pm ET. A companion series, titled Power Surge (stylized as NWA Powerrr Surge), premiered on April 13, 2021, and features wrestler interviews, unseen matches, and Power recaps.

NWA USA
NWA USA is a weekly program that debuted on January 8, 2022 on YouTube and focuses on the NWA Junior Heavyweight Championship division.

Former

NWA Shockwave
NWA Shockwave was a web television program that aired on the NWA's YouTube channel and Facebook page. The series debuted on December 1, 2020. On August 10, 2020, it was announced that the NWA will partner with the United Wrestling Network (UWN) to produce a live, weekly pay-per-view (PPV) series named UWN Primetime Live. Matches from this series would also be featured as part of Shockwave.

Pay-per-view events 

This is a list of NWA pay-per-view events produced while under the ownership of Lightning One, Inc. (2017–present)

Championships and accomplishments

Current champions

Men's division
Singles

Tag team

Women's division
Singles

Tag team

Footnotes

See also
 List of National Wrestling Alliance territories
 List of National Wrestling Alliance championships

Notes

References

External links
 
 

 
1948 establishments in the United States
American professional wrestling promotions
Jim Crockett Promotions
Corporate governance in the United States
Organizations established in 1948

el:World Wrestling Entertainment#National Wrestling Alliance